In vivo magnetic resonance spectroscopy (MRS) is a specialized technique associated with magnetic resonance imaging (MRI).

Magnetic resonance spectroscopy (MRS), also known as nuclear magnetic resonance (NMR) spectroscopy, is a non-invasive, ionizing-radiation-free analytical technique that has been used to study metabolic changes in brain tumors, strokes, seizure disorders, Alzheimer's disease, depression, and other diseases affecting the brain. It has also been used to study the metabolism of other organs such as muscles. In the case of muscles, NMR is used to measure the intramyocellular lipids content (IMCL).

Magnetic resonance spectroscopy is an analytical technique that can be used to complement the more common magnetic resonance imaging (MRI) in the characterization of tissue. Both techniques typically acquire signal from hydrogen protons (other endogenous nuclei such as those of Carbon, Nitrogen, and Phosphorus are also used), but MRI acquires signal primarily from protons which reside within water and fat, which are approximately a thousand times more abundant than the molecules detected with MRS. As a result, MRI often uses the larger available signal to produce very clean 2D images, whereas MRS very frequently only acquires signal from a single localized region, referred to as a "voxel". MRS can be used to determine the relative concentrations and physical properties of a variety of biochemicals frequently referred to as "metabolites" due to their role in metabolism.

Data Acquisition
Acquiring an MRS scan is very similar to that of MRI with a few additional steps preceding data acquisition. These steps include:

Shimming the magnetic field: this step is taken to correct for the inhomogeneity of the magnetic field by tuning different pulses in the x, y, and z directions. This step is usually automated but can be performed manually. 
Suppressing the water signal: because water molecules contain hydrogen, and the relative concentration of water to metabolite is about 10,000:1, the water signal is often suppressed or the metabolite peaks will not be discernible in the spectra. This is achieved by adding water suppression pulses. Recent advances allow proton MRS without water suppression. 
Choosing a spectroscopic technique: careful planning of measurements is important in the context of a specific experiment. 
Single Voxel Spectroscopy (SVS): has a minimum spatial resolution of approximately 1 cm3, and has the cleanest spectrum free from unwanted artifacts due to the small acquired volume leading to easy shim and less unwanted signals from outside the voxel. 
Magnetic Resonance Spectroscopic Imaging (MRSI): a 2-dimensional (or 3-dimensional) MRS technique which uses two/three phase-encoding directions to create a two/three-dimensional map of spectra. The drawbacks of this technique is that having two/three phase encoding directions requires lengthy scan time, and the larger volume of acquisition is more likely to introduce artefacts due to poorer shimming, unsuppressed water, as well as the inherent sinc point-spread-function due to the finite sampling of k-space which results in the signal from one voxel bleeding into all others.

Data Quantification 
During data acquisition, the scan acquires raw data in the form of spectra. This raw data must be quantified to achieve a meaningful understanding of the spectrum. This quantification is achieved via linear combination. Linear combination requires knowledge of the underlying spectral shapes, referred to as basis sets. Basis sets are acquired either via numerical simulation or experimentally measured in phantoms. There are numerous packages available to numerically simulate basis sets, including MARSS, FID-A, among others such as GAMMA, VESPA and Spinach. With the basis sets, the raw data can now be quantified as measured concentrations of different chemical species. Software is used to complete this. LCModel, a commercial software, has been for most of the field's history the standard software quantification package. However, now there are many freeware packages for quantification: AMARES, AQSES, Gannet, INSPECTOR, jMRUI, TARQUIN, and more.

Before linear combination, peak extraction used to be used for data quantification. However, this is no longer popular nor recommended. Peak extraction is a technique which integrates the area underneath a signal. Despite its seemingly straightforwardness, there are several confounds with this technique. Chiefly, the individual Lorentzian shapes employed do not scale up to match the complexity of the spectral shapes of J-coupled metabolites and is too simple to discern between overlapping peaks.

Pulse Sequences
Similar to MRI, MRS uses pulse sequences to acquire signal from several different molecules to generate a spectra instead of an image. In MRS, STEAM (Stimulated Echo Acquisition Method) and PRESS (Point Resolved Spectroscopy) are the two primary pulse sequence techniques used. In terms of advantages, STEAM is best for imaging metabolites with shorter T2 and has lower SAR, while PRESS has higher SNR than STEAM. STEAM and PRESS are most widely used due to their implementation on the major vendors of MR scanners. Beyond STEAM and PRES there are sequences which utilize adiabatic pulses. Adiabatic pulses produce uniform flip angles even when there is extreme B1 inhomogeneity. Thus, these sequences allow us to achieve excitation that achieves the sought-for B1 insensitivity and off-resonance in the RF coil and sampled object. Specifically, adiabatic pulses solve the problem of signal dropout that comes from the different B1 flux patterns that result from the surface transmit coils used and the usage of normal pulses. Adiabatic pulses are also useful for constraints on RF peak power for excitation and lowering tissue heating. Additionally, adiabatic pulses have substantially higher bandwidth, which reduces chemical shift displacement artefact, which is particularly important at high field strengths and when a large range of frequencies are desired to be measured (i.e., measuring both the signals upfield and downfield of water in proton MRS).

Spatial Localization Sequences 
In PRESS, the two chief drawbacks are lengthy echo time (TE) and chemical shift displacement (CSD) artifacts. Lengthy echo time arises from the fact that PRESS uses two 180° pulses, unlike STEAM which uses exclusively 90° pulses. The duration of 180° pulses are generally longer than 90° pulses because it takes more energy to flip a net magnetization vector completely as opposed to only 90°. Chemical shift displacement artifacts arises partly because of less optimal slice selection profiles. Multiple 180° pulses does not allow a very short TE, resulting in less optimal slice selection profile. Additionally, multiple 180° pulses means smaller bandwidth and thus larger chemical shift displacement. Specifically, the chemical shift displacement artifacts occur because signals with different chemical shifts experience different frequency-encoded slice selections and thus do not originate from same volume. Additionally, this effect becomes greater at higher magnetic field strengths.

SPECIAL consists of a spatially selective pre-excitation inversion pulse (typically AFP) followed by spatially selective excitation and refocusing pulses, both of which are usually SLR or truncated sinc pulses.

SPECIAL is a hybrid of PRESS and Image-Selected In Vivo Spectroscopy (ISIS). ISIS achieves spatial localization in the three spatial dimensions through a series of eight slice-selective preinversion pulses that can be appropriately positioned so that the sum of the eight cycles removes all signal outside the desired 3D region. SPECIAL obtains spatial localization from only a single dimension with pre-excitation inversion pulses (cycled on and off every other repetition time [TR]), making it a two-cycle sequence.

The use of the preinversion pulse to remove one refocusing pulse (as compared with PRESS) is what allows SPECIAL to achieve a short TE, reaching a minimum of 2.2 msec on a preclinical scanner in rat brain while being able to recover the full signal and as low as 6 msec on a clinical 3T scanner.

The largest drawback of SPECIAL and SPECIAL-sLASER is that they are two-cycle schemes, and systematic variations between cycles will manifest in their difference spectrum. Lipid contamination is a particularly large problem with SPECIAL and similar sequences.

The state-of-the-art localization sequence is sLASER, which utilizes two pairs of adiabatic refocusing pulses. This has recently been recommended by consensus.

The first is through OVS, which will reduce the contamination of lipid signals that originate from outside the voxel, although this comes at the cost of an increase in SAR. The second is not to set the amplitude of the pre-excitation inversion pulse to zero every other TR, but instead to shift the location of this ISIS plane such that the excited volume for the off condition is outside the object. This has been shown to greatly reduce lipid contamination, speculated to have arisen from the interaction between the RF pulse and lipid compartments due to incomplete relaxation, magnetization transfer, or the homonuclear Overhauser effect, although the exact mechanism remains unknown. The third is to use an echo-planar readout that dephases magnetization from outside the voxel, also shown to substantially reduce lipid artifacts. All three methods could be combined to overcome lipid contamination.

One of the dimensions to understand about a pulse sequence is its coherence pathway. The coherence pathway is the sequence of quantum coherence number(s) the signal takes prior to its acquisition. All coherence pathways end in -1, as this is the only coherence pathway detected by quadrature coils. The spin echo-type sequences (PRESS, sLASER, LASER) simply alternate between +1 and -1. For example, the coherence pathway for PRESS (expressed as a vector) is [-1, 1, -1]. This indicates that after the initial RF pulse (excitation pulse) the spins have a -1 quantum coherence. The refocusing pulses then swap the -1 to +1, then back from +1 to -1 (where it is then detected). Similarly for sLASER the coherence pathway is [-1, 1, -1, 1, -1]. The coherence pathway for LASER is [-1, 1, -1, 1, -1, 1, -1]. The coherence pathway for sPECIAL is [0, 1, -1]. This indicates that after the first RF pulse the signal resides as a population, due to its 0 quantum coherence number. Coherence pathways are critical as the explain how the sequences are affected by crushers and phase cycling. As such, coherence pathway analysis has been used to develop optimized crusher schemes and phase cycling schemes for an arbitrary MRS experiment.

Uses
MRS allows doctors and researchers to obtain biochemical information about the tissues of the human body in a non-invasive way (without the need for a biopsy), whereas MRI only gives them information about the structure of the body (the distribution of water and fat).

For example, whereas MRI can be used to assist in the diagnosis of cancer, MRS could potentially be used to assist in information regarding to the aggressiveness of the tumor. Furthermore, because many pathologies appear similar in diagnostic imaging (such as radiation-induced necrosis and recurring tumor following radiotherapy), MRS may in the future be used to assist in distinguishing between similarly appearing prognoses.

MRS equipment can be tuned (just like a radio receiver) to pick up signals from different chemical nuclei within the body. The most common nuclei to be studied are protons (hydrogen), phosphorus, carbon, sodium and fluorine.

The types of biochemicals (metabolites) which can be studied include choline-containing compounds (which are used to make cell membranes), creatine (a chemical involved in energy metabolism), inositol and glucose (both sugars), N-acetylaspartate, and alanine and lactate which are elevated in some tumors.

At present MRS is mainly used as a tool by scientists (e.g. medical physicists and biochemists) for medical research projects, but it is becoming clear that it also has the ability to give doctors useful clinical information, especially with the discovery that it can be used to probe the concentration of alpha-Hydroxyglutaric acid, which is only present in IDH1 and IDH2 mutated gliomas, which alters the prescribed treatment regimen.

MRS is currently used to investigate a number of diseases in the human body, most notably cancer (in brain, breast and prostate), epilepsy, Alzheimer's disease, Parkinson's disease, and Huntington's chorea. MRS has been used to diagnose pituitary tuberculosis.

Prostate cancer: Combined with a magnetic resonance imaging (MRI) and given equal results, then the three-dimensional MRS can predict the prevalence of a malignant degeneration of prostate tissue by approximately 90%. The combination of both methods may be helpful in the planning of biopsies and therapies of the prostate, as well as to monitor the success of a therapy.

Example

Shown below is an MRI brain scan (in the axial plane, that is slicing from front-to-back and side-to-side through the head) showing a brain tumor (meningioma) at the bottom right. The red box shows the volume of interest from which chemical information was obtained by MRS (a cube with 2 cm sides which produces a square when intersecting the 5 mm thick slice of the MRI scan).

Each biochemical, or metabolite, has a different peak in the spectrum which appears at a known frequency.  The peaks corresponding to the amino acid alanine, are highlighted in red (at 1.4 ppm). This is an example of the kind of biochemical information which can help doctors to make their diagnosis. Other metabolites of note are choline (3.2 ppm) and creatine (3.0 ppm).

Applications of MRS

In 1H Magnetic Resonance Spectroscopy each proton can be visualized at a specific chemical shift (peak position along x-axis) depending on its chemical environment. This chemical shift is dictated by neighboring protons within the molecule. Therefore, metabolites can be characterized by their unique set of 1H chemical shifts. The metabolites that MRS probes for have known (1H) chemical shifts that have previously been identified in NMR spectra. These metabolites include:

 N-acetyl Aspartate (NAA): with its major resonance peak at 2.02 ppm, decrease in levels of NAA indicate loss or damage to neuronal tissue, which results from many types of insults to the brain. Its presence in normal conditions indicates neuronal and axonal integrity.
 Choline: with its major peak at 3.2 ppm, choline is known to be associated with membrane turnover, or increase in cell division. Increased choline indicates increase in cell production or membrane breakdown, which can suggest demyelination or presence of malignant tumors.
 Creatine and phosphocreatine: with its major peak at 3.0 ppm, creatine marks metabolism of brain energy. Gradual loss of creatine in conjunction with other major metabolites indicates tissue death or major cell death resulting from disease, injury or lack of blood supply. Increase in creatine concentration could be a response to cranialcerebral trauma. Absence of creatine may be indicative of a rare congenital disease.
 Lipids: with their major aliphatic peaks located in the 0.9–1.5 ppm range, increase in lipids is seen is also indicative of necrosis. These spectra are easily contaminated, as lipids are not only present in the brain, but also in other biological tissue such as the fat in the scalp and area between the scalp and skull.
 Lactate: Is an AX3 system which results in a doublet (two symmetric peaks) centered about 1.31 ppm, and a quartet (four peaks with relative peak heights of 1:2:2:1) centered about 4.10 ppm. The doublet at 1.31 ppm is typically quantified as the quartet may be suppressed through water saturation or obscured by residual water. In healthy subjects lactate is not visible, for its concentration is lower than the detection limit of MRS; however, presence of this peak indicates glycolysis has been initiated in an oxygen-deficient environment. Several causes of this include ischemia, hypoxia, mitochondrial disorders, and some types of tumors.
 Myo-inositol: with its major peak at 3.56 ppm, an increase in Myo-inositol has been seen to be disrupted in patients with Alzheimer's, dementia, and HIV patients.
 Glutamate and glutamine: these amino acids are marked by a series of resonance peaks between 2.2 and 2.4 ppm. Hyperammonemia, hepatic encephalopathy are two major conditions that result in elevated levels of glutamine and glutamate. MRS, used in conjunction with MRI or some other imaging technique, can be used to detect changes in the concentrations of these metabolites, or significantly abnormal concentrations of these metabolites.
 GABA can be detected primarily from its peaks at approximately 3.0 ppm, however because creatine has a strong singlet at 3.0 ppm with approximately 20x the amplitude a technique which exploits J-coupling must be used to accurately quantify GABA. The most common techniques for this are J-difference editing (MEGA), or J-resolved (as used in JPRESS)
 Glutathione can also be detected from its peak at peak at 3.0 ppm, however similar to GABA it also must use a method which exploits J-coupling to remove the overlaying creatine signal.

Limitations of MRS
The major limitation to MRS is its low available signal due to the low concentration of metabolites as compared to water. As such, it has inherently poor temporal and spatial resolution. Nevertheless, no alternate technique is able to quantify metabolism in vivo non-invasively and thus MRS remains a valuable tool for research and clinical scientists.

In addition, despite recent efforts toward international expert consensus on methodological details like shimming, motion correction, spectral editing, spectroscopic neuroimaging, other advanced acquisition methods, data processing and quantification, application to brain, proton spectroscopy application to skeletal muscle, phosphorus application to skeletal muscle, methods description, results reporting, and other considerations, currently published implementations of in vivo magnetic resonance spectroscopy cluster into literatures exhibiting a broad variety of individualized acquisition, processing, quantification, and reporting techniques. This situation may contribute to a low sensitivity and specificity of, for example, in vivo proton magnetic resonance spectroscopy to disorders such as multiple sclerosis, that continue to fall below clinically beneficial thresholds for, e.g., diagnosis.

Non-Proton (1H) MRS
31Phosphorus Magnetic Resonance Spectroscopy

1H MRS's clinical success is only rivaled by 31P MRS. This is in large part because of the relatively high sensitivity of phosphorus NMR (7% of protons) combined with a 100% natural abundance.
Consequently, high-quality spectra are acquired within minutes. Even at low field strengths, great spectra resolution is obtained because of the relatively large (~30 ppm) chemical shift dispersion for in vivo phosphates. Clinically, phosphorus NMR excels because it detects all metabolites playing key roles in tissue energy metabolism and can indirectly deduce intracellular pH. However, phosphorus NMR is chiefly challenged by the limited number of metabolites it can detect.

13Carbon Magnetic Resonance Spectroscopy

In contrast to phosphorus NMR, carbon NMR is an insensitive technique. This arises from the fact that 13C NMR has a low abundance (1.1%) and carbon's low gyromagnetic ratio. This low abundance is because 12C does not have a magnetic moment, making it not NMR active, leading to 13C's use for spectroscopy purposes. However, this low sensitivity can be improved via decoupling, averaging, polarization transfer, and larger volumes. Despite the low natural abundance and sensitivity of 13C, 13C MRS has been used to study several metabolites, especially glycogen and triglycerides. It has proven especially useful at providing insight on the metabolic fluxes from 13C-labeled precursors. There is great overlap in what 1H MRS and 13C MRS can obtain spectra-wise and large reason, combined with 1H MRS's high sensitivity, why 13C MRS has never seen wide application like 1H MRS. See also Hyperpolarized carbon-13 MRI.

23Sodium Magnetic Resonance Spectroscopy

Sodium NMR is infamous for its low sensitivity (9.2% relative to proton sensitivity) and low SNR because of its low sodium concentration (30 - 100 mM), especially compared to protons (40 - 50 M). However, interest in sodium NMR has been reinspired by recent significant gains in SNR at high magnetic fields, along with improved coil designs and optimized pulse sequences. There is much hope for sodium NMR's clinical potential because the detection of abnormal intracellular sodium in vivo may have significant diagnostic potential and reveal new insights into tissue electrolysis homeostasis.

19Fluorine Magnetic Resonance Spectroscopy

Fluorine NMR has high sensitivity (82% relative to proton sensitivity) and 100% natural abundance. However, it is important to note that no endogenous 19F containing compounds are found in biological tissues and thus the fluorine signal comes from an external reference compound. Because19F is not found in biological tissues, 19F does not have to deal with interference from background signals like in vivo 1H MRS does with water, making it especially powerful for pharmacokinetic studies. 1H MRI provides the anatomical landmarks, while 19F MRI/MRS allows us to follow and map the specific interactions of specific compounds.  in vivo 19F MRS can be used to monitor the uptake and metabolism of drugs, study the metabolism of anesthetic, determine cerebral blood flow, and measure, via fluorinated compounds ("probes"), various parameters like pH, oxygen levels, and metal concentration.

See also 
Functional magnetic resonance spectroscopy of the brain
Magnetic resonance imaging
Magnetization transfer
NMR
NMR spectroscopy

References

External links 
Online Physics Tutorial for MRI and MRS

In vivo
Nuclear magnetic resonance spectroscopy